Tall Mahtabi (also Romanized as Tall Mahtābī) is a village in Rostaq Rural District, in the Central District of Neyriz County, Fars Province, Iran. At the 2006 census, its population was 1,039, in 239 families.

References 

Populated places in Neyriz County